The 12333 / 12334 Vibhuti Express is a Superfast Express train of Indian Railways – Eastern Railway zone that runs between  and Prayagraj Rambag in India.

It operates as train number 12333 from Howrah Junction to Prayagraj Rambag and as train number 12334 in the reverse direction, serving the states of West Bengal, Jharkhand, Bihar & Uttar Pradesh.

Coaches

The 12333 / 12334 Howrah–Prayagraj Rambag Vibhuti Express presently has 2 AC 2 cum AC 3 tier, 2 AC 3 tier, 9 Sleeper Class, 4 General Unreserved & 2 SLR (seating cum luggage rake) coaches. It does not have a pantry car.

As is customary with most train services in India, coach composition may be amended at the discretion of Indian Railways depending on demand.

Service

The 12333 Howrah–Prayagraj Rambag Vibhuti Express covers the distance of 882 kilometres in 16 hours 00 mins (55.13 km/hr) & in 15 hours 50 mins as 12334 Prayagraj Rambag–Howrah Vibhuti Express (55.71 km/hr).

As the average speed of the train is above , as per Indian Railways rules, its fare includes a Superfast surcharge.

Routeing

Traction

As the route is fully electrified, it is hauled by a Howrah based WAP-4 locomotive between Howrah Junction & Prayagraj Rambag.

Timings

 12333 Howrah–Prayagraj Rambag Vibhuti Express leaves Howrah Junction on a daily basis at 20:00 hrs IST and reaches Prayagraj Rambag at 12:00 hrs IST the next day.
 12334 Prayagraj Rambag–Howrah Vibhuti Express leaves Prayagraj Rambag on a daily basis at 15:40 hrs IST and reaches Howrah Junction at 07:30 hrs IST the next day.

There are many journey videos of this train are present in Youtube, one of the video's link in given below:-https://youtu.be/LBxK1UCzQKQ

References

External links

Trains from Allahabad
Rail transport in Howrah
Express trains in India
Rail transport in West Bengal
Rail transport in Jharkhand
Rail transport in Bihar
Named passenger trains of India